Ahriman, or Angra Mainyu, is the "destructive spirit" in Zoroastrianism.

Ahriman may also refer to:

Religious concepts
 An entity in the philosophy of anthroposophy
 A name (Ahrimanius) inscribed on the lion-headed figure in Roman Mithraism

Video games
 A race of monsters in the Final Fantasy game series
 Ahriman (Warhammer 40,000), a character in the Warhammer 40,000 game series
 Ahriman, an evil god in Prince of Persia (2008 video game)
 The titular character in Kohan: Ahriman's Gift
 A long-dead warlock in Ahriman's Prophecy, a title in Aveyond game series

Other uses
 Ahriman (Highlander), a figure in Highlander: The Series
 Lord Ahriman, pseudonym of the founder and guitarist of the black metal band Dark Funeral
 Dr. Ahriman, a psychologist in False Memory (novel) by Dean Koontz
 R.E. Mann, a character in Asimov's short story The Last Trump